Witold Abramowicz is a Polish scientist, professor of economics, postdoctoral degree in mathematics and engineer, chair of the Department of Information Systems at PUEB. He received the Knight's Cross of the Polonia Restituta Cross in 2019.

References 

Living people
Knights of the Order of Polonia Restituta
Polish scientists
Academic staff of the Poznań University of Economics and Business
Year of birth missing (living people)